Washington County is located in the southeastern part of the U.S. state of Missouri.  As of the 2020 United States census, the population was 23,514.  The county seat and largest city is Potosi.  The county was officially organized on August 21, 1813, and was named in honor of George Washington, the first President of the United States.

History
The French explorers Renault and La Motte entered the area of present-day Potosi in 1722–23.  However, no permanent settlements were made until 1763, when François Breton settled near Potosi and began to operate a mine bearing his name.  The Bellview Valley, near Caledonia and Belgrade, was settled in 1802 by the families of William and Helen Watson Reed, their sons, Robert, Joseph, and Thomas Reed, William Reed's brother and nephew, Joseph and William Reed, Annanias McCoy, and Benjamin Crow.  Washington County was officially organized on August 21, 1813, out of Ste. Genevieve County.

Geography

Adjacent counties
 Franklin County (north)
 Jefferson County (northeast)
 St. Francois County (east)
 Iron County (south)
 Crawford County (west)

National protected area
 Mark Twain National Forest (part)

Demographics

As of the census of 2000, there were 23,344 people, 8,406 households, and 6,237 families residing in the county. There were 9,894 housing units at an average density of 13 per square mile (5/km2). The racial makeup of the county was 95.47% White, 2.48% Black or African American, 0.66% Native American, 0.15% Asian, 0.01% Pacific Islander, 0.15% from other races, and 1.08% from two or more races. Approximately 0.73% of the population were Hispanic or Latino of any race.

There were 8,406 households, out of which 36.40% had children under the age of 18 living with them, 58.60% were married couples living together, 10.60% had a female householder with no husband present, and 25.80% were non-families. 22.00% of all households were made up of individuals, and 9.40% had someone living alone who was 65 years of age or older. The average household size was 2.64 and the average family size was 3.05.

In the county, the population was spread out, with 26.60% under the age of 18, 9.80% from 18 to 24, 29.20% from 25 to 44, 22.70% from 45 to 64, and 11.70% who were 65 years of age or older. The median age was 35 years. For every 100 females there were 106.40 males. For every 100 females age 18 and over, there were 106.40 males.

The median income for a household in the county was $32,001, and the median income for a family was $38,193. Males had a median income of $27,871 versus $18,206 for females. The per capita income for the county was $16,095. About 17.10% of families and 20.80% of the population were below the poverty line, including 25.40% of those under age 18 and 12.90% of those age 65 or older.

Religion
According to the Association of Religion Data Archives County Membership Report (2000), Washington County is a part of the Bible Belt with evangelical Protestantism being the majority religion. The most predominant denominations among residents in Washington County who adhere to a religion are Roman Catholics (36.73%), Southern Baptists (21.74%), and Baptist Missionary Association of America (16.86%).

2020 Census

Politics

Local
Republicans hold a sizeable majority of the elected positions in the county.

State
Washington County is divided into three legislative districts in the Missouri House of Representatives.

 District 118 – Currently represented by Mike McGirl (R-Potosi) and consists of the northeastern part of the county and includes Cadet, Mineral Point, Old Mines, Richwoods, Tiff, and part of Potosi. 

 District 119 – Currently represented by Nate Tate (R-St. Clair). Consists of the northwestern part of the county, including Pea Ridge.

 District 144 – Currently represented by Chris Dinkins (R-Annapolis). Consists of the southern parts of the county including Belgrade, Caledonia, Courtois, Hopewell, Irondale, and part of Potosi. 

All of Washington County is a part of Missouri's 3rd District in the Missouri Senate and is currently represented by Elaine Gannon (R-De Soto).

Federal

Washington County is included in Missouri's 8th Congressional District and is currently represented by Jason T. Smith (R-Salem) in the U.S. House of Representatives. Smith won a special election on Tuesday, June 4, 2013, to finish out the remaining term of U.S. Representative Jo Ann Emerson (R-Cape Girardeau). Emerson announced her resignation a month after being reelected with over 70 percent of the vote in the district. She resigned to become CEO of the National Rural Electric Cooperative.

Political culture

At the presidential level, Washington County was a fairly independent-leaning or battleground county for many years, however, it has voted increasingly more Republican in recent elections. While George W. Bush carried Washington County in 2004, he narrowly lost the county to Al Gore in 2000, and both times the margins of victory were significantly closer than in many of the other rural areas. Bill Clinton also carried Washington County both times in 1992 and 1996 by convincing double-digit margins, and unlike most of the other rural counties in Missouri, Washington County was one of only nine counties in Missouri that favored Barack Obama over John McCain. Obama won Washington County by just five votes in the 2008 election.

Like most rural areas throughout Missouri, voters in Washington County generally adhere to socially and culturally conservative principles but are more moderate or populist on economic issues, typical of the Dixiecrat philosophy. In 2004, Missourians voted on a constitutional amendment to define marriage as the union between a man and a woman—it overwhelmingly passed Washington County with 81.37 percent of the vote. The initiative passed the state with 71 percent of support from voters as Missouri became the first state to ban same-sex marriage. In 2006, Missourians voted on a constitutional amendment to fund and legalize embryonic stem cell research in the state—it failed in Washington County with 56.48 percent voting against the measure. The initiative narrowly passed the state with 51 percent of support from voters as Missouri became one of the first states in the nation to approve embryonic stem cell research. Despite Washington County's longstanding tradition of supporting socially conservative platforms, voters in the county have a penchant for advancing populist causes like increasing the minimum wage. In 2006, Missourians voted on a proposition (Proposition B) to increase the minimum wage in the state to $6.50 an hour—it passed Washington County with 81.47 percent of the vote. The proposition strongly passed every single county in Missouri with 75.94 percent voting in favor as the minimum wage was increased to $6.50 an hour in the state. In 2018, Washington County rejected Proposition A which would have made Missouri a right to work state with 82.1 percent of the vote.

Donald Trump won the county with 75% of the vote in 2016, continuing a trend of white, rural Midwestern counties that had voted for Obama in 2008 and/or 2012 and had swung hard to Trump in 2016. The Trump campaign had made promises to bolster the jobs situations in the Rust Belt, which combined with elevated social liberalism from the Democrats, may have played a role in the margins—which could be said for various other white working-class Midwestern counties that did the same.

Missouri presidential preference primary (2008)

In the 2008 presidential primary, voters in Washington County from both political parties supported candidates who finished in second place in the state at large and nationally.

Former U.S. Senator Hillary Clinton (D-New York) received more votes, a total of 2,345, than any candidate from either party in Washington County during the 2008 presidential primary. She also received more votes, almost double, than the total number of votes cast in the entire Republican Primary in Washington County. Washington County was Clinton's fifth strongest county in Missouri; she only did better in Dunklin, Wayne, Carter and Ripley counties.

Education
Among adults 25 years of age and older in Washington County, 62.5% possess a high school diploma or higher, while 7.5% hold a bachelor's degree or higher as their highest educational attainment.

Public schools
 Kingston K-XIV School District – Cadet
 Kingston Elementary School (PK-05)
 Kingston Middle School (06-08)
 Kingston High School (09-12)
 Potosi R-III School District – Potosi
 Potosi Pre-School (PK)
 Potosi Elementary School (PK-03)
 Trojan Intermediate School (04-06)
 John A. Evans Middle School (07-08)
 Potosi High School (09-12) 
 Richwoods R-VII School District – Richwoods
 Richwoods Elementary School (PK-08)
 Valley R-VI School District – Caledonia/ Belgrade
 Valley Elementary School (K-6) – Caledonia
 Valley High School (07-12)- Caledonia

Private schools
 St. Joachim Elementary School – Cadet – (PK-08) – Roman Catholic

Colleges and universities
 Mineral Area College Annex – Potosi – A satellite campus of Mineral Area College-Park Hills.

Public libraries
 Washington County Library

Government and infrastructure
The Potosi Correctional Center of the Missouri Department of Corrections is located in an unincorporated area in the county. The prison houses male death row inmates.

911
 Washington County Central Dispatch Center. Administrator (vacant)
 Dispatchers - approximately 14

Fire Departments
 Potosi Fire Protection District.  Chief- Roger LaChance
 Firemen- 25–30 
 Junior Firemen- 3–7
 Potosi House#1. 313 E Jefferson St.  Downtown/South County Station
 Potosi House#2 State Highway AA Sunnen Lake Station
 Potosi House#3. State Highway E. Tiff Station
 Potosi House#4. State Highway 21.  Northeast County/Washington State Park Station
 Potosi House#5. State Highway 185 North County/Indian Creek Station
 Richwoods Fire Protection District. Chief- David Hoffmann Jr
 Firemen – 36
 Junior Firemen – 1
 No. Of Stations – 1
 No. Of Trucks – 10
 Area District – Town of Richwoods, Parts of Blackwell, Fletcher, Lonedell, and Sullivan Zip Codes.
 District Highway Coverage
 State Hwy 47
 State Hwy A
 State Hwy H
 State Hwy T
 State Hwy WW
 Irondale Fire Protection District. Chief- Bill Byers
 Firemen- 15–20
 Junior Firemen- 3–5
 No. Of Stations- 1
 No. Of Trucks- 5
 Area District- City of Irondale
 District Highway Coverage
 State Hwy M
 State Hwy 8
 State Hwy U
 Belgrade Fire Protection District. Chief- Bob Hayworth
 Firemen- 5–7
 Junior Firemen- 0
 Number of Stations 2
 Number of Trucks 8
 Area District- City of Belgrade- Village of Caledonia- Palmer- Quaker- Delbridge
 District Highway Coverage-
 State Hwy C
 State Hwy 21 Bootleg Park @ Gildea Rd
 State Hwy 32 Iron County
 State Hwy DD
 State Hwy P
 State Hwy Y
 State Hwy BB
 State Hwy JJ
 State Hwy Z
 Council Bluff Beach-Camping Area
 Caledonia Fire Department. Chief- Charles Hampton
 Firemen- 15–20
 Junior Firemen- 1
 No. Of Stations- 1
 No. Of Trucks- 6
 Area District- Village of Caledonia- City of Belgrade
 District Highway Coverage
 State Hwy 21
 State Hwy 32
 State Hwy M

Ambulance District
Washington County Ambulance District. Administrator – Justin Duncan
 Supervisors – 3
 Paramedics / CCT-Paramedics – 25
 EMT-B      – 14
 No. of Stations – 2
 No. of Ambulances – 7
 No. of Support Vehicles – 2
 Area District – All of Washington County

Law Enforcement
Washington County Sheriff's Office
 Sheriff –    Zach Jacobsen
 Captain –    Shannon Thompson
 Lieutenant – 
 Sergeant –   Christopher Barton
 Corporal –   Garth Rogers, Joseph Jenkins, Scott Pratt and Amanda Randazzo
 Jurisdiction – All of Washington County

Potosi Police Department
 Chief –      Michael Gum
 Captain –   
 Lieutenant – 
 Sergeant –   Jonie Boyer
 Corporal –
 Corporal –

Missouri Department of Conservation
 Conservation Agent –    Lucas McClamroch

United States Forestry Service
 Forestry Ranger –    <VACANT>

Attractions
 Big River Access – Belgrade
 Council Bluff Lake – Belgrade
 Berryman Camp & Trail National Forest – Berryman
 Bootleg Park Bootleg Access – Caledonia
 Buford Mountain  – Caledonia
 Hughes Mountain Natural Area – Irondale
 Bismarck Conservation Area – Bismarck
 Little Indian Creek Conservation Area – Sullivan
 Pea Ridge Conservation Area – Sullivan
 YMCA of the Ozarks – Shirley

Transportation

Primary state highways
 Route 8. Hopewell-Potosi
 Route 21. Cadet-Potosi-Caledonia
 Route 32. Caledonia-Bismarck
 Route 47. Lonedell-Richwoods-Blackwell
 Route 104. Blackwell
 Route 185. Sullivan-Ebo-Potosi

Secondary state highways

 State Route A. Richwoods-Sullivan
 State Route AA.  Shirley
 State Route BB.  Belgrade
 State Route C. Belgrade-Viburnum 
 State Route CC.  Blackwell
 State Route DD.  Belgrade
 State Route E. Potosi-Cadet-Blackwell 
 State Route EE.  Sullivan
 State Route F. Potosi
 State Route H. Richwoods-Fletcher
 State Route JJ.  Belgrade 
 State Route M. Irondale
 State Route N. Sullivan
 State Route o. Mineral Point
 State Route P. Belgrade-Potosi
 State Route T. Richwoods
 State Route U. Irondale-Mineral Point
 State Route W. Bourbon
 State Route WW.  Fletcher
 State Route N. Bourbon
 State Route Y. Viburnum-Belgrade-Berryman
 State Route Z. Belgrade

Airports
 Washington County Airport

Railroads
 Union Pacific Railroad

Communities

Cities
 Irondale
 Potosi (county seat)

Villages
 Caledonia
 Mineral Point

Unincorporated communities

 Anthonies Mill
 Aptus
 Baryties
 Bellefontaine
 Belgrade
 Berryman
 Bliss
 Cadet
 Cannon Mines
 Courtois
 Cruise Mill
 Delbridge
 Ebo
 Fertile
 Floyd
 French Town
 Frogtown
 Happy Hollow
 Hopewell
 Horton Town
 Hulsey
 Hurricane
 Latty
 Levy
 Maryden
 Northcut
 Old Mines
 Peoria
 Quaker
 Rabbitville
 Racola
 Richwoods
 Robidoux
 Shibboleth
 Shirley
 Summit
 Sunlight
 Theabeau Town
 Tiff

Townships

 Belgrade
 Breton
 Concord
 Harmony
 Johnson
 Kingston
 Liberty
 Richwoods
 Union
 Walton

See also

 National Register of Historic Places listings in Washington County, Missouri

References

External links
 Digitized 1930 Plat Book of Washington County  from University of Missouri Division of Special Collections, Archives, and Rare Books

 
Regions of Greater St. Louis
1813 establishments in Missouri Territory
Populated places established in 1813